Aframomum zambesiacum is a species in the ginger family, Zingiberaceae. Its common name is nangawo. It is native to Kimalila, part of the southern highlands in Tanzania.

Aframomum zambesiacum is a leafy plant that grows from a short, branched rhizome. Petals are white with a large crimson patch at the base. Seeds are shiny and dark-brown.

Notes

References
 
 

zambesiacum
Plants described in 1898
Flora of Tanzania
Taxa named by Karl Moritz Schumann
Taxa named by John Gilbert Baker